Giorgetto Giugiaro (born 7 August 1938) is an Italian automotive designer. He has worked on supercars and popular everyday vehicles. He was born in Garessio, Cuneo, Piedmont.

Giugiaro was named Car Designer of the Century in 1999 and inducted into the Automotive Hall of Fame in 2002.

In addition to cars, Giugiaro designed camera bodies for Nikon, Navigation promenade of Porto Santo Stefano, in 1983, the organ of the cathedral of Lausanne (composed of about 7000 pipes) in 2003, and developed a new pasta shape, "Marille". He also designed several watch models for Seiko, mainly racing chronographs, as well as office furniture for Okamura Corporation.

Influence on design

Giugiaro's earliest cars, like the Alfa Romeo 105/115 Series Coupés, often featured tastefully arched and curving shapes, such as the De Tomaso Mangusta, Iso Grifo, and Maserati Ghibli. In the late 1960s, Giugiaro made increasingly angular designs, culminating in the "folded paper" era of the 1970s. Straight-lined designs such as the BMW M1, Lotus Esprit S1, and Maserati Bora followed. He changed again during the early 1990s, introducing a more curvy approach with his Lamborghini Calà, Maserati Spyder, and Ferrari GG50.

Giugiaro is widely known for the DMC DeLorean. Notable in its own time for its unique design, the car was prominently featured in the Hollywood blockbuster movie series Back to the Future. His most commercially successful design was the Volkswagen Golf Mk1.

In 1976, Giugiaro explored a new taxi concept with the Museum of Modern Art (MOMA), which became the 1978 Lancia Megagamma concept. Fiat had commissioned the 1978 concept from Italdesign, asking for a 4-meter length, high roof, high h-point, multi-functional, monospace design — but ultimately decided the concept was too risky for production. In retrospect the Megagamma was more influential than successful in its own right. It is considered the "conceptual birth mother of the MPV/minivan movement." it influenced design of such mini/compact MPVs as the Nissan Prairie (1981) and Fiat 500L (2011), as well as larger MPVs, including the Renault Espace and Chrysler minivans.

Studios
 Fiat Special Vehicle Design (1955–1959)
 Bertone (1959–1965)
 Ghia (1965–1967)
 Studi Italiani Realizzazione Prototipi (SIRP, 1968)
 Italdesign Giugiaro (1968–2015)
GFG Style (2015–present)

Designs

Automobiles

Cameras

 Nikon
 EM (1979)
 F3 (1980) 
L35AF (1983)
 F4 (1988)
 F5 (1996)
 D2H (2003)
 F6 (2004)
 D3 (2007)
 D4 (2012)
 D800 (2012)
 Df (2013)

Firearms
Handguns
 Beretta Neos (2002)
Submachine Guns
Beretta CX4 Storm (2003)
Shotguns
 Beretta UGB25 Xcel Trap 12 GA, 30"

Motorcycles
 Ducati 860 GT (1975)
 Suzuki RE5 (1975)
Derbi Predator (1998)
TOMOS A5 Colibri (1989) moped
 MV Agusta 350 Ipotesi

Other
 FIAT Ferroviaria/Alstom ETR 460 (Pendolino) train (1993)
 Nitro concept tractor (2013)
 Seiko Speedmaster wrist watch (1986)
 Seiko Macchina Sportiva wrist watch
 Deutz Fahr 6215 RCSHIFT tractor (2017)
Navigation promenade of Porto Santo Stefano, Tuscany
 Marille Pasta
 Organ of the cathedral of Lausanne, composed of about 7000 pipes
 Molten basketball design (official game ball for FIBA)

References

External links 
 Italdesign, Giugiaro's industrial design group
 Coachbuild.com Encyclopedia: Giugiaro 
 Bontempi Minstrel
 BMW Designers  An overview of automotive designers working for BMW.

1938 births
Living people
People from Garessio
Italian automobile designers
Italian industrial designers
Italdesign Giugiaro
Lamborghini people
BMW designers
Ferrari people
Alfa Romeo people
Maserati people
Compasso d'Oro Award recipients